Stalked: Murder in Slow Motion is a crime, television documentary mini-series narrated by Kym Marsh. The series explores the impact of stalking on women. One of the aims of the documentary is to highlight these dangers and encourage people to support legislation changes in order to prevent future stalkings and murders.

Episodes 
<onlyinclude>

Development

Just before the documentary Kym Marsh shared her own experiences to the Sun about living in fear from stalkers.

References

External links 

Channel 5
ITN Productions

Channel 5 (British TV channel) original programming
2019 British television series debuts
2019 British television series endings
2010s British documentary television series
2010s British crime television series
True crime television series
English-language television shows
Violence against women in the United Kingdom